Trichosilia was a genus of moths of the family Noctuidae, it is now considered a subgenus of Feltia.

Former Species
 Trichosilia acarnea (Smith, 1905)

References
Natural History Museum Lepidoptera genus database
Trichosilia at funet

Noctuinae